Sanmenxia (postal: Sanmenhsia) is a prefecture-level city in the west of Henan Province, China. The westernmost prefecture-level city in Henan, Sanmenxia borders Luoyang to the east, Nanyang to the southeast, Shaanxi Province to the west and Shanxi Province to the north. The city lies on the south side of the Yellow River at the point where the river cuts through the Loess Plateau on its way to the North China Plain.

As of the 2020 census, it was home to 2,034,872 inhabitants (2,234,018 in 2010). However, as of the 2010 census 947,588 lived in the built-up area made of Hubin, Shanzhou urban districts and Pinglu County in neighboring Shanxi (269,188 inhabitants), now within the agglomeration.

Names and History
The city's name in Chinese means "The Gorge of Three Gateways" and is derived from two islands that split the Yellow River into three parts.

According to Chinese mythology, Yu the Great used a divine axe to cut the mountain ridge three times, creating the Sanmenxia gorges to prevent massive flooding. The three "men" or gates were then named "The Gateway of Man", "The Gateway of Gods" and "The Gateway of Devils".

With the construction of the Sanmenxia Dam in the late 1950s, the ancient passes were flooded.

During the Western Zhou Dynasty, Sanmenxia was part of the territory of the State of Western Guo, ruled by relatives of the ruling Ji family of Zhou. Guo moved its capital from modern day Baoji to Shangyang, next to Sanmenxia. Later, this territory was annexed the State of Jin.

Archaeological finds near Sanmenxia between 1956 and 1991 revealed mass chariot graves and bronzeware of Western Guo State rulers. Furthermore, the archaeological site “Shihao Section of Xiaohan Ancient Road”, an excavated pathway that is part of the world heritage site “Silk Roads: the Routes Network of Chang'an-Tianshan Corridor”, is also located in Sanmenxia. In 2011, the Sanmenxia Cultural Sports Centre Stadium opened. The association football venue has a capacity of 22,000.

Geography and climate
Sanmenxia is located in western Henan on the southern (right) bank of the Yellow River, and is surrounded on three sides by mountains, with elevations generally increasing from northeast to southwest. The prefecture is at the intersection of Henan, Shanxi, and Shaanxi provinces, bordering Luoyang to the east, Nanyang to the south, Weinan (Shaanxi) to the west, and Yuncheng (Shanxi) to the north across the Yellow River.

Sanmenxia has a mostly dry, monsoon-influenced continental climate with four seasons. Winters are moderately cold and very dry, while summers are hot and humid. More than half of the annual precipitation falls from July to September. There are between 184 and 218 frost-free days per annum. In the Köppen system, the city is in the transition zone between a humid subtropical climate (Köppen Cwa) and humid continental climate (Köppen Dwa), and receives barely enough precipitation to avoid being semi-arid (Köppen BSk).

Administration 
The prefecture-level city of Sanmenxia administers two districts, two county-level cities and two counties.

 Hubin District
 Shanzhou District
 Lingbao City
 Yima City
 Lushi County
 Mianchi County

Transportation 

China National Highway 209
China National Highway 310

References

External links 
 Government Website of Sanmenxia 
 City Map 

Cities in Henan
National Forest Cities in China
Prefecture-level divisions of Henan